The Chen Shi-yin Western Style House is a house in Jincheng Township, Kinmen County, Taiwan.

History
The house was established in 1932 by Chen Shi-yin, a local merchant, and his wife, Hsueh Hsien-chen. Chen became rich after surge in demand due to World War I, thus making him constructing the house after returned to Kinmen from Dutch East Indies and British Singapore. The full construction of the house was coordinate by Hsueh and his nephew, Chen Wen-fan. When Chen passed away, the house was only half completed. Hsueh then settled in the house for four years before the World War II broke out. She then left Kinmen to Singapore for good. Around 1983, the house was used to house the teachers of Kinmen Senior High School.

Architecture
The house features a protruding turtle head at its entrance part. It was constructed with western and Chinese-style architecture. The doorway couplets were written Fu Hsi-chi.

See also
 List of tourist attractions in Taiwan

References

1932 establishments in Taiwan
Buildings and structures in Kinmen County
Houses completed in 1932
Houses in Taiwan
Jincheng Township